Tim Jansma (Sept. 13, 1952- October 25, 2016) was a notable contemporary luthier; a maker of violins, violas and cellos. He apprenticed at William Moennig and Son in Philadelphia and graduated from the International School of Violin Making of Cremona, Italy. The original Jansma Violin Shop was in Cremona, Italy and later was permanently established in Fremont, Michigan, USA in 1977. 
Jansma instruments are sold around the world to professional musicians and students.

Biography
Jansma began his training in his father's woodworking shop at the age of 8. He studied violin performance into his college years; his teachers included Walter Verdehr of Michigan State University and Frank Costanza of the Philadelphia Orchestra. He apprenticed at the violin shop of William Moennig and Son in Philadelphia, one of the oldest and most distinguished dealers and appraisers of rare violins, violas, cellos and their bows in the world, founded in 1909. During this period, Jansma completed his training in string instrument restoration while simultaneously studying and playing upon some of the most notable violins in history. The Moennig shop had acquired much of the Rembert Wurlitzer Co. collection, a fine collection of historically important string instruments. Jansma was often summoned from his workbench in order to play instruments made by Antonio Stradivarius, Giuseppe Guarneri, Joannes Baptista Guadagnini, Domenico Montagnana, Francesco Ruggeri, Jean-Baptiste Vuillaume to name a few. 
After Jansma completed his training at Moennig and Son, he subsequently enrolled into the International School of Violin Making of Cremona, where he learned Italian violin making techniques and earned his diploma.
As a specialist in tonewoods, Jansma sold Yugoslavian maple and Italian spruce to the Cremonese makers while located in Europe, and later to American makers. 
As a musician, he performed with the Grand Rapids Symphony, Lansing Symphony Orchestra and West Shore Symphony (now West Michigan Symphony Orchestra). 
Jansma instruments are made in the Cremonese tradition, implementing age-old techniques from Jansma's early training and from decades of experience in making and restoration. His instruments are favored by symphony musicians for their sound and ease of response, and by soloists for their penetrating resonance.

Personal life
Tim was married and had two children, both fine musicians themselves.

Quotes 
Competing at every price range - Ko Iwasaki, Bernard Greenhouse and Yo-Yo Ma gather after a concert at the 2000 World Cello Congress and compare a Jansma cello to the 1707 "Stanlein" Stradivari cello:

“Iwasaki excuses himself and collects his own cello, then returns to the room. He too possesses a “Strad,” dated 1727, but this is a copy – one of six he has 
commissioned from the craftsman Timothy Jansma. This is Iwasaki's favorite copy the one he has brought to the Congress – and the men discuss proportion, dimension, comparing the two instruments. What they do not talk about – though the Stanlein, if sold, would fetch millions of dollars - is price.”
Note: The Countess of Stanlein Ex-Paganini Stradivarius cello sold for $6million in 2012.

Music Advocacy
Tim Jansma served as board member for Blue Lake Fine Arts Camp. He was the string instrument specialist for Interlochen Arts Academy, and appeared as guest speaker for universities, music conservatories and civic organizations.

Stolen Instrument
A Jansma violin was returned to its owner by authorities after it was stolen from a Cleveland hotel parking lot. Resolving the case was a collaborative effort between local authorities, the media, Cleveland violin dealer Yabing Chen, and public tips to the police.

References

https://www.meaningfulfunerals.net/?action=obituaries.obit_view&CFID=4e26dd91-7925-4ef9-89cf-1a36de8daa8f&CFTOKEN=0&o_id=3988640&fh_id=12100

See also
AFVBM Bio
Bio at violinist.com

Living people
Place of birth missing (living people)
People from Fremont, Michigan
People from Philadelphia
American luthiers
1952 births